is a former Japanese football player. She played for Japan national team.

Club career
Shikata was born in Kamakura on November 5, 1979. When she was a high school student, she joined Yomiuri-Seiyu Beleza (later Nippon TV Beleza) in 1995. She was selected Best Eleven in 2005. She retired in 2008.

National team career
In December 2001, Shikata was selected Japan national team for 2001 AFC Championship. At this competition, on December 4, she debuted against Singapore. She also played at 2006 Asian Cup. This competition was her last game for Japan. She played 8 games for Japan until 2006.

National team statistics

References

1979 births
Living people
Kanagawa University alumni
People from Kamakura
Association football people from Kanagawa Prefecture
Japanese women's footballers
Japan women's international footballers
Nadeshiko League players
Nippon TV Tokyo Verdy Beleza players
Women's association football defenders